P. ginsenosidimutans may refer to:

Phycicoccus ginsenosidimutans, a Gram-positive bacterium.
Pseudobacter ginsenosidimutans, a Gram-negative bacterium of the genus Pseudobacter.